The 1998 NCAA Division III men's basketball tournament was the 24th annual single-elimination tournament to determine the national champions of National Collegiate Athletic Association (NCAA) men's Division III collegiate basketball in the United States.

The field contained sixty-four teams, and each program was allocated to one of four sectionals. All sectional games were played on campus sites, while the national semifinals, third-place final, and championship finals were contested at the Salem Civic Center in Salem, Virginia.

Wisconsin–Platteville defeated Hope, 69–56, in the final, clinching their third overall national title and third championship in seven seasons (1991 and 1995). It was also Hope's second defeat in the final in three years (1996).

The Pioneers (30–0) were coached by Bo Ryan; this was the third title at Platteville for the future Wisconsin coach. Platteville were furthermore the first Division III team to finish a season undefeated since their own perfect season in 1995. 

Ben Hoffmann, also from Platteville, was named Most Outstanding Player.

Championship Rounds
Site: Salem Civic Center, Salem, Virginia

See also
 1998 NCAA Division I men's basketball tournament
 1998 NCAA Division II men's basketball tournament
 1998 NAIA Division I men's basketball tournament
 1998 NAIA Division II men's basketball tournament
 1998 NCAA Division III women's basketball tournament

References

NCAA Division III men's basketball tournament
NCAA Men's Division III Basketball
Ncaa Tournament
Sports competitions in Salem, Virginia